Afif is a city in central Saudi Arabia, in the Najd region. It is situated approximately halfway between Riyadh and Mecca.  The modern town was established in the 1910s as a hijra, or "settlement", for the nomadic tribes of the area, particularly the tribe of 'Utaybah (see Ikhwan).  It has since grown into a small city of 39,581 as of the 2004 census, not counting the surrounding towns and villages, which together with 'Afif form the 'Afif Governorate.

The city once served as a gateway between the central and western regions of Saudi Arabia. The city is also known to be the first landing site of the first airplane owned by King Abdulaziz the first king of Saudi Arabia.

The town was named after an old well in the area called Afif "بئر عفيف - البير العود". People used to pass by this well in their way to Mekkah while performing the Hajj or Omrah, in order to get water for the rest of the way. Eventually, during the month of Hajj, merchants began to congregate around this well to sell their goods to the pilgrims, which led to the first settlements being established. Thereafter, the people from small villages nearby the well started to recognise how profitable it was to live nearby this well, and houses started to be built there, which caused the city to develop over time.

Landmarks
 LORAN-C transmitter Afif

See also 

 List of cities and towns in Saudi Arabia
 Regions of Saudi Arabia

References

Populated places in Riyadh Province
Populated places established in the 1910s